Tauchen is a surname. Notable people with the surname include:

 Gary Tauchen (born 1953), American farmer and politician
 Jaromír Tauchen (born 1981), Czech lawyer, law-historian, certified judiciary interpreter, and translator

See also
Taucher (disambiguation)